Babiy Yar (also known as Babij Jar) is a 2003 film directed by Jeff Kanew and starring Michael Degen.

Filmed in Europe and given a limited theatrical release, the film recounts the mass murders in September 1941 of thousands of Jews, Soviet POWs, communists, Romani people and civilian hostages by German Einsatzgruppen, and Ukrainian nationalist collaborators in the title location, a ravine in Kyiv (the capital of Ukraine).

See also
 Babi Yar

References

External links
 

2003 films
Films directed by Jeff Kanew
English-language Belarusian films
2003 drama films
Holocaust films
Films set in 1941
Films set in the Soviet Union
Films set in Ukraine
Eastern Front of World War II films